Milton Leon Banks (October 17, 1958 – July 18, 2007), was an American basketball player best known for his seasons spent touring with the Harlem Globetrotters. He started his basketball career at Cal-Poly in 1979, he was a member of several 3x3 (basketball), or Hoop-it-up championship teams, Dino Smiley's Drew League, and was named to the Venice Beach's basketball Hall of Fame in 2012 along the likes of Kobe Bryant.

Early life
Milton Leon Banks was born on October 17, 1958, in Los Angeles, California. He is the son of the late Cleola and Herbert Banks Jr. Milton attended Russell Elementary and 28th Street School in Los Angeles. His family soon relocated to Pomona, California, where he would grow up.

Career
He began his career as a basketball player after graduating from Garey High School in 1976. From there he went on to play for Mt. San Antonio College in Walnut, CA, and shortly thereafter, he returned home to Pomona, Ca to play for Cal-Poly's basketball team from 1979-1980. Milton's 6'7 stature quickly gained him notice among the NCAA division II teams. In 1993 he attracted the attention of the Harlem Globetrotters, landing a position on their team. He went on tour with the Globetrotters a few seasons which led him to accepting roles on T.V., The Steve Harvey Show, and movies Sunset Park 1996, and B*A*P*S in 1997.

Philanthropy
Milton was an avid member and proud supporter of Athletes in Action, which is a ministry that uses sports to help lead others to Christ. He would also volunteer at local Boys and Girls Clubs of America as a mentor to the kids.

Filmography
 B*A*P*S 1997
 Sunset Park (film) 1996
 The Steve Harvey Show (T.V. show) 1996

References

External links
 Harlem Globetrotters All Time Roster https://web.archive.org/web/20121208045155/http://www.harlemglobetrotters.com/harlem-globetrotters-all-time-roster
 Basketball Profile http://basketball.usbasket.com/player/Milton-Banks/Cameroon/California-State-Polytechnica-Un.-Pomona/155193
 California Sneakers mobile Museum http://www.gettyimages.com/detail/news-photo/california-sneakers-mobile-museum-featuring-former-harlem-news-photo/564052377

1958 births
People from Pomona, California
Harlem Globetrotters players
2007 deaths
American male actors